The Humboldt Volunteers, or Humboldt Dragoons, were a militia company formed by residents of the Eel River Valley, at Hydesville, Humboldt County, California in early February 1860. Seman Wright was elected captain, and E. D. Holland was elected First Lieutenant of this unit. This company had several clashes with bands of Indians in the Eel River Valley during February 1860. They were said to have perpetrated the Indian Island Massacre on the night of February 26, 1860 and others at other sites around the Bay and on the Eel River. News of these massacres brought a storm of criticism that compelled the Humboldt Volunteers to disband in the latter part of 1860.

See also
List of California State Militia civil war units

References

Further reading
Rohde, Jerry,  Genocide and Extortion: 150 years later, the hidden motive behind the Indian Island Massacre, North Coast Journal, 25 February 2010, accessed 11 January 2013.

Military history of California
Native American history of California
Bald Hills War
Ethnic cleansing in the United States
1860 in California
Militias
History of Humboldt County, California
Wars between the United States and Native Americans
Military units and formations established in 1860
1860 establishments in California